Harendra de Silva is a pediatrician whose efforts have helped to create awareness of child abuse in Sri Lanka.

Education
de Silva  was educated at Ananda College Colombo, before he entered the Faculty of Medicine, University of Colombo, where he obtained both an undergraduate Bachelor of Medicine, Bachelor of Surgery and later Doctor of Medicine.

Professional work
de Silva was appointed to the Department of Paediatrics in Galle. He was the senior lecturer and subsequently became head of the department. de Silva became a Professor of Paediatrics, moving to the University of Kelaniya in 1999. He was Chairman of the National Child Protection Authority and has been Chairman of the Presidential Task Force on Child Protection.

Honours
de Silva was awarded the 'Most Outstanding Asian Pediatrician Award' from the Asian Pediatrics Association and the Career Award from the International Society against Child Abuse and Neglect (USA). He was shortlisted for the 2011 British Medical Journal Group Lifetime Achievement Award.

References

Sinhalese academics
Alumni of Ananda College
Alumni of the University of Colombo
Living people
Fellows of the Royal College of Physicians
Vidya Jyothi
Sinhalese physicians
Year of birth missing (living people)